James William Fowler (April 6, 1915 – October 17, 1985) was a professional ice hockey player who played 135 games in the National Hockey League with the Toronto Maple Leafs between 1936 and 1939. He also played several years in minor leagues during his career, which lasted from 1933 to 1939. Fowler was born in Toronto, Ontario.

Career statistics

Regular season and playoffs

External links 
 

1915 births
1985 deaths
Canadian ice hockey defencemen
Ice hockey people from Toronto
Ontario Hockey Association Senior A League (1890–1979) players
Syracuse Stars (AHL) players
Syracuse Stars (IHL) players
Toronto Maple Leafs players
Toronto Young Rangers players